Arthur Koestler: The Story of a Friendship is a book by George Mikes published in 1983, soon after Arthur Koestler’s suicide. As the author states in the Introduction, the book is not a biography of the subject but a series of recollections and anecdotes of a friendship spanning more than thirty years from 1952 up to the time of Koestler’s suicide in March 1983.

References

1983 non-fiction books
Arthur Koestler
British biographies
Biographies about writers